Henry Davis (16 December 1803 – 29 February 1848) was an English cricketer who was recorded in one first-class match in 1826 when he played for a combined Sheffield and Leicester team, scoring 27 runs in his only innings and holding one catch. Davis played for Leicester Cricket Club from 1823 to 1839.

References

1803 births
1848 deaths
English cricketers
English cricketers of 1826 to 1863
Leicestershire cricketers
People from Groby
Cricketers from Leicestershire